Vedesha Tirtha ( - ) (also known as Vedesha Bhiksu), was an Indian Hindu scholar and theologian in the Dvaita Vedānta tradition. He was the disciple of Raghuttama Tirtha and Vedavyasa Tirtha, and is the most celebrated name in the annals of the Dvaita Vedanta. He is a Bidi-Sanyasi (stray ascetic) and not pontiff of any mutt.

Works
Vedesha Bhiksu composed ten major works, most of them are commentaries and glosses on the works of Madhva and Jayatirtha.

Tattvoddyota Panchika - a gloss on Tattvoddyota of Madhva
Pramāṇalakṣaṇaṭikā Vyakhyana - a gloss on Pramāṇalakṣaṇaṭikā of Jayatirtha
Viṣṇutattvanirṇayaṭikā Vyakhyana - a gloss on Viṣṇutattvanirṇayaṭikā of Jayatirtha
Kathālakṣaṇavivarana Vyakhyana - a gloss on Kathālakṣaṇavivarana of Jayatirtha.
Karmaṅirṅayaṭikā Vyakhyana - a gloss on Karmaṅirṅayaṭikā of Jayatirtha.
Aitareya Upanishad Bhashya -  a commentary on Aitareya Upanishad Bhashya of Madhva
Chandogya Upanishad Bhashya - a commentary on Chandogya Upanishad Bhashya of Madhva
Katha Upanishad Bhashya - a commentary on Katha Upanishad Bhashya of Madhva
Talabavara tippani - a commentary on Kena Upanishad Bhashya of Madhva.
Pramāṇapaddhatī Vyakhyana - a gloss on Pramāṇapaddhatī of Jayatirtha

Brindavana
His tomb is at Manur on the bank of Bhima river, which was a center of learning right from the days of predecessors of Raghuttama Tirtha himself.

References

Bibliography
 

Indian Hindu saints
Madhva religious leaders
Dvaitin philosophers
17th-century Indian philosophers
17th-century Hindu philosophers and theologians